The Padma Vibhushan ("Lotus Decoration") is the second-highest civilian award of the Republic of India, after the Bharat Ratna. Instituted on 2 January 1954, the award is given for "exceptional and distinguished service". All persons without distinction of race, occupation, position or sex are eligible for these awards. However, government servants including those working with PSUs, except doctors and scientists, are not eligible for these Awards. , the award has been bestowed on 325 individuals, including nineteen posthumous and twenty-one non-citizen recipients.

During 1 May and 15 September of every year, the recommendations for the award are submitted to the Padma Awards Committee, constituted by the Prime Minister of India. The recommendations are received from all the state and the union territory governments, the Ministries of the Government of India, the Bharat Ratna and previous Padma Vibhushan award recipients, the Institutes of Excellence, the Ministers, the Chief Ministers and the Governors of State, and the Members of Parliament including private individuals. The committee later submits their recommendations to the Prime Minister and the President of India for the further approval. The award recipients are announced on Republic Day.

The first recipients of the award were Satyendra Nath Bose, Nand Lal Bose, Zakir Hussain, Balasaheb Gangadhar Kher, Jigme Dorji Wangchuck, and V. K. Krishna Menon, who were honoured in 1954. The 1954 statutes did not allow posthumous awards but this was subsequently modified in the January 1955 statute. The "Padma Vibhushan", along with other personal civil honours, was briefly suspended twice, from July 1977 to January 1980 and from August 1992 to December 1995. Some of the recipients have refused or returned their conferments. P. N. Haksar, Vilayat Khan, E. M. S. Namboodiripad, Swami Ranganathananda, and Manikonda Chalapathi Rau refused the award, the family members of Lakshmi Chand Jain (2011) and Sharad Anantrao Joshi (2016) declined their posthumous conferments, and Baba Amte returned his 1986 conferment in 1991.

Most recently on 26 January 2023, the award has been bestowed upon six recipients; Balakrishna Doshi, Zakir Hussain, S. M. Krishna, Dilip Mahalanabis, S. R. Srinivasa Varadhan, and Mulayam Singh Yadav.

History
On 2 January 1954, a press release was published from the office of the secretary to the President of India announcing the creation of two civilian awards—Bharat Ratna, the highest civilian award, and the three-tier Padma Vibhushan, classified into "Pahela Varg" (Class I), "Dusra Varg" (Class II), and "Tisra Varg" (Class III), which rank below the Bharat Ratna. On 15 January 1955, the Padma Vibhushan was reclassified into three different awards: the Padma Vibhushan, the highest of the three, followed by the Padma Bhushan and the Padma Shri.

The award, along with other personal civilian honours, was briefly suspended twice in its history; for the first time in July 1977 when Morarji Desai was sworn in as the fourth Prime Minister of India, for being "worthless and politicized". The suspension was rescinded on 25 January 1980 after Indira Gandhi returned as  Prime Minister. 

The civilian awards were suspended again in mid-1992, when two Public-Interest Litigations were filed in the High Courts of India, one in the Kerala High Court on 13 February 1992 by Balaji Raghavan and another in the Madhya Pradesh High Court (Indore Bench) on 24 August 1992 by Satya Pal Anand. Both petitioners questioned the civilian awards being "titles" per an interpretation of Article 18 (1) of the Constitution of India.

On 25 August 1992, the Madhya Pradesh High Court issued a notice temporarily suspending all civilian awards. A Special Division Bench of the Supreme Court of India was formed comprising five judges: A. M. Ahmadi C. J., Kuldip Singh, B. P. Jeevan Reddy, N. P. Singh, and S. Saghir Ahmad. On 15 December 1995, the Special Division Bench restored the awards and delivered a judgment that the "Bharat Ratna and Padma awards are not titles under Article 18 of the Constitution of India".

Regulations
The award is conferred for "exceptional and distinguished service", without distinction of race, occupation, position, or sex. The criteria include "service in any field including service rendered by Government servants", but excludes those working with the public sector undertakings, with the exception of doctors and scientists. The 1954 statutes did not allow posthumous awards, but this was subsequently modified in the January 1955 statute; Aditya Nath Jha, Ghulam Mohammed Sadiq, and Vikram Sarabhai became the first recipients to be honoured posthumously in 1972.

The recommendations are received from all state and union territory governments, the Ministries of the Government of India, the Bharat Ratna and previous Padma Vibhushan award recipients, the Institutes of Excellence, the Ministers, the Chief Ministers, the Governors of State, and the Members of Parliament, including private individuals. The recommendations received during 1 May and 15 September of every year are submitted to the Padma Awards Committee, convened by the Prime Minister of India. The Awards Committee later submits its recommendations to the Prime Minister and the President of India for further approval.

The Padma Vibhushan award recipients are announced every year on Republic Day of India and registered in The Gazette of Indiaa publication released weekly by the Department of Publication, Ministry of Urban Development used for official government notices. The conferral of the award is not considered official without its publication in the Gazette. Recipients whose awards have been revoked or restored, both of which actions require the authority of the President, are also registered in the Gazette and are required to surrender their medals when their names are struck from the register.

Specifications
The original 1954 specifications of the award called for a circle made of gold gilt  in diameter, with rims on both sides. A centrally located lotus flower was embossed on the obverse side of the medal and the text "Padma Vibhushan" written in Devanagari script was inscribed above the lotus along the upper edge of the medal. A floral wreath was embossed along the lower edge and a lotus wreath at the top along the upper edge. The Emblem of India was placed in the centre of the reverse side with the text "Desh Seva" in Devanagari Script on the lower edge. The medal was suspended by a pink riband  in width divided into two equal segments by a white vertical line.

A year later, the design was modified. The centrally placed pattern made of outer lines of a square of  side is embossed with a knob carved within each of the outer angles of the pattern. A centrally located lotus flower is embossed on the obverse side of the medal and the text "Padma" written in Devanagari script is placed above and the text "Vibhushan" is placed below the lotus.

The Emblem of India is placed in the centre of the reverse side with the national motto of India, "Satyameva Jayate" (Truth alone triumphs), in Devanagari Script, inscribed on the lower edge. The rim, the edges. and all embossing on either side is of white gold with the text "Padma Vibhushan" of silver gilt. The medal is suspended by a pink riband  in width.

The medal is ranked fourth in the order of precedence of wearing of medals and decorations. The medals are produced at Alipore Mint, Kolkata along with the other civilian and military awards like Bharat Ratna, Padma Bhushan, Padma Shri, and Param Veer Chakra.

Recipients

The first recipients of the Padma Vibhushan were Satyendra Nath Bose, Nandalal Bose, Zakir Husain, Balasaheb Gangadhar Kher, V. K. Krishna Menon, and Jigme Dorji Wangchuck, who were honoured in 1954. , the award has been bestowed on 314 individuals, including seventeen posthumous and twenty-one non-citizen recipients. 

Some of the conferments have been refused or returned by the recipients; P. N. Haksar, Vilayat Khan, E. M. S. Namboodiripad, Swami Ranganathananda, and Manikonda Chalapathi Rau refused the award. The family members of Lakshmi Chand Jain (2011) and Sharad Anantrao Joshi (2016) declined their posthumous conferments. Baba Amte returned his 1986 conferment in 1991.

Explanatory notes

References

Bibliography

External links

 
 

Awards established in 1954
Civil awards and decorations of India